The Slovenian International in badminton is an international open held in Slovenia regularly since 1993.

It took place also as unofficial international championship from 1963 until 1976, when Slovenia was part of Yugoslavia. There are several events at the Slovenian International, men's singles, women's singles, men's doubles, women's doubles, and mixed doubles.

Previous winners

Slovenian International

Slovenia Future Series

Performances by countries

Slovenian International

Slovenia Future Series

References 

 badmintonpeople.com

Badminton tournaments
Badminton tournaments in Slovenia
Sports competitions in Slovenia
Recurring sporting events established in 1963
1963 establishments in Yugoslavia